Maryvale is a locality in Dubbo Regional Council, New South Wales, Australia.

Railway

Only the Sandy Hollow–Gulgong section has been completed as part of Ulan Mine Rail Link to Newcastle, although most of the earthworks, culverts, bridge abutments and so on and Tunnel No 5 of 5 on the Sandy Hollow to Maryvale Triangular or Y Junction section(located at ) were built on the section between Gulgong and Maryvale between 1937 and 1951.

References

Towns in the Central West (New South Wales)
Dubbo Regional Council